The 2011–12 Akron Zips men's basketball team represented the University of Akron during the 2011–12 NCAA Division I men's basketball season. The Zips, led by eighth year head coach Keith Dambrot, played their home games at James A. Rhodes Arena and were members of the East Division of the Mid-American Conference. The Zips finished the season 22–12, 13–3 in MAC play to finish as East Division champions and overall regular season champions. Akron failed to win the MAC tournament losing in the championship game to Ohio. As regular season champions, the Zips received an automatic bid into the National Invitation Tournament where they lost in the first round to Northwestern.

Roster

Schedule

|-
!colspan=9 style=| Exhibition

|-
!colspan=9 style=| Regular season

|-
!colspan=9 style=|MAC tournament

|-
!colspan=9 style=|NIT

References

Akron Zips men's basketball seasons
Akron
Akron